The Monterrey metropolitan area refers to the surrounding urban agglomeration of Monterrey, Nuevo León. Officially called Area Metropolitana de la Ciudad de Monterrey or AMM, the metropolitan area is the 2nd-largest in Mexico.

Overview
The Monterrey metropolitan area is composed of the municipalities/cities of:
Apodaca
Cadereyta Jiménez
Escobedo
García
Guadalupe
Juárez
Monterrey
Salinas Victoria
San Nicolás de los Garza
San Pedro Garza García
Santa Catarina
Santiago

There are three adjacent towns that do not maintain continuous urban development with the core urban area. These towns are considered strategic as the metropolitan area grows and integrates them:
Ciénega de Flores
General Zuazua
Pesquería

References

External links 

INEGI - Statistics of the ZMM - 2001
 https://www.nuevoleon.gob.mx

 
Metropolitan areas of Mexico